Parapoynx dentizonalis is a moth in the family Crambidae. It was described by George Hampson in 1897. It is found in Australia, where it has been recorded from Queensland.

References

Acentropinae
Moths described in 1897